Kurt Garschal (born 11 August 1941) is an Austrian former cyclist. He competed in the team pursuit at the 1960 Summer Olympics.

References

External links
 

1941 births
Living people
Austrian male cyclists
Olympic cyclists of Austria
Cyclists at the 1960 Summer Olympics
Cyclists from Vienna